Bereznitsy is a rural locality (a village) in Seletskoye Rural Settlement, Suzdalsky District, Vladimir Oblast, Russia. The population was 18 as of 2010. There are 2 streets.

Geography 
Bereznitsy is located 8 km east of Suzdal (the district's administrative centre) by road. Lyakovitsy is the nearest rural locality.

References 

Rural localities in Suzdalsky District